The Allegiant Travel Company is an American travel and hospitality company that is the parent of Allegiant Air. Other subsidiaries include Sunseeker Resorts and Allegiant Nonstop. The Allegiant Travel Company is headquartered in the Las Vegas suburb of Summerlin, Nevada and is publicly traded on the Nasdaq exchange under the stock ticker symbol, ALGT. Its chairman and CEO is Maurice J. Gallagher Jr.

History

The Allegiant Travel Company was founded in 1999 as the parent company of Allegiant Air, which itself had been founded in 1997. Initially based out of Fresno, California, the company reorganized in 2000 with Maurice J. Gallagher Jr. gaining an almost 20 percent stake in the company. He had previously been a prominent creditor of Allegiant and was one of the co-founders of ValuJet Airlines. 

In May 2006, Allegiant Travel Company filed plans for an initial public offering (IPO). It officially began trading on the Nasdaq exchange under the stock ticker symbol, ALGT, in December of that year. 

By 2019, Allegiant Travel's primary subsidiary, Allegiant Air, had switched from a fleet predominately composed of MD-80s to one exclusively composed of Airbus jets.

Subsidiaries

Allegiant Air

Allegiant Air was founded in 1997 and is the ninth-largest commercial airline in the United States as of January 2020. Part of Allegiant Air's business model includes earning commissions by selling passengers ancillary items like rental cars, hotel rooms, tickets to events, amusement park passes, and other add-ons. The airline has a fleet composed of 85 Airbus jets that serves more than 500 routes across the country.

Sunseeker Resorts

Plans for the inaugural Sunseeker Resort in Charlotte County, Florida (known as Sunseeker Resort Charlotte Harbor) were announced in August 2017. Construction on the project was initially halted due to the COVID-19 pandemic, but resumed in 2021 with plans for the 500 room, 180 extended-stay suite resort.

Other

The Allegiant Travel Company also counts the golf course management software firm, Teesnap, as one of its subsidiaries. The company was founded in 2013 and has been owned by Allegiant since its outset. The firm's software was being used by 590 golf courses as of July 2019, but was also looking for a buyer for the subsidiary as of the same date. Another Allegiant subsidiary, Game Plane, created an eponymous game show that was filmed on Allegiant Air flights, which ran during 2014 and 2015 on the Discovery Family Channel. Allegiant Travel also operated an information technology company called Allegiant Systems that had the goal of selling software systems to other airlines.

Allegiant Travel formerly operated family entertainment centers in Utah and Michigan. Known as Allegiant Nonstop, the company closed the centers in 2020.

Sponsorships
The Allegiant Travel Company is the official sponsor of several sports teams and venues.

Allegiant Stadium

In August 2019, Allegiant was awarded the naming rights for the home of the Las Vegas Raiders and the UNLV Rebels football team, Allegiant Stadium. It is also the official airline of the Raiders.

Other sport sponsorships
In July 2018, Allegiant was named the official airline of Minor League Baseball (MiLB). In December of that year, it announced a credit card partnership with the MiLB that would allow Allegiant credit card holders to earn points in relation to their local baseball teams and communities.

Allegiant is also the official domestic airline partner of the Vegas Golden Knights. In September 2019, the company unveiled a Golden Knights-themed plane that featured a livery with the team's logo. In January 2020, Allegiant signed a deal to become the official airline of the Indianapolis Colts, and the following year became the official airline of the Pac-12 Conference.

See also
 List of Allegiant Air destinations
 List of S&P 600 companies

References

External links
Allegiant Air
Sunseeker Resorts

Hospitality companies established in 1999
Companies listed on the Nasdaq
Companies based in Las Vegas
1999 establishments in Nevada